Colección La Fauna (La Fauna Collection), is a series of books about the Fauna of Venezuela.

The first four titles were published in 2019 by Ediciones La Fauna KPT, based in Madrid.

The collection have as origin the studies by German-born, Venezuelan zoologist, Pedro Trebbau, along with the documentary research of Israel Cañizales and Salvador Boher. The adaptation of the texts were made by writer Eduardo Sánchez Rugeles.

The illustrations were made by the artist Leonardo Rodríguez.

The editorial director of the collection is Miriam Ardizzone, the art direction is in charge of Manuel González Ruiz

History
The collection is part of the project for rescue of the scientific works of Pedro Trebbau, initiated with the re-edition of the book The Turtles of Venezuela (2018), as well of the publication of the biography Trebbau: Maestro por naturaleza (2018), by Albor Rodríguez.

Trebbau is known for the promotion and preservation of Venezuelan wildlife and nature.

Titles

References

Science and technology in Venezuela
Biology books
Popular science books